Dampyr is a 2022 Italian horror-fantasy film directed by Riccardo Chemello, based on the comic series Dampyr published by Sergio Bonelli Editore.

It is the first installment of the Bonelli Cinematic Universe (BCU), a shared universe between movie and television projects by Bonelli Entertainment, division of Sergio Bonelli Editore.

Cast

Production
A film adaptation of Dampyr was announced by Sergio Bonelli Editore at 2018 Lucca Comics & Games. Directed by Riccardo Chemello and produced by Bonelli, Eagle Pictures e Brandon Box, filming started in Romania in October 2019. On 1 November 2019, the cast was revealed, with Wade Briggs as Harlan "Dampyr" Draka, the titular character, Stuart Martin and Frida Gustavsson as Dampyr's allies Emil Kurjak and Tesla Dubcek, David Morrissey as the antagonist Gorka, Sebastian Croft as Yuri and Luke Roberts as Draka, Harlan's father.

Release
The film was released in Italy on 28 October 2022.

See also 
 List of Italian films of 2022

References

External links

2020s Italian-language films
2022 fantasy films
2022 horror films
Italian fantasy films
Italian horror films
Italian vampire films
Films based on Italian comics
Films set in 1992
Films shot in Romania
Yugoslav Wars films
2020s Italian films